Youngolepis is a genus of prehistoric coelocanth which lived during the Early Devonian period (Lochkovian to Pragian stages, about 407-416 million years ago). Fossils of Y. praecursor have been found in the Xitun Formation of China & the Bac Bun Formation of Trang Xa, Vietnam. Some additional fossil specimens from the Xishancun Formation of China have been referred to Youngolepis sp. & represent the oldest known occurrence of the genus. In addition, Y. praecursor is also found in the Xujiachong formation

References 

Prehistoric lobe-finned fish genera
Devonian fish of Asia